Kathleen Ann Ryg (born August 6, 1952) is a former Democratic member of the Illinois House of Representatives, representing the 59th district from 2003 until 2009. The district includes all or part of Vernon Hills, Prairie View, Long Grove, Buffalo Grove, Mettawa, Lake Forest, Lake Bluff, Green Oaks, Gurnee, Waukegan, Indian Creek, Lincolnshire, Mundelein, North Chicago, Park City, Riverwoods, Wheeling, and Northbrook.

Ryg served on the following House Committees:
Appropriations-Human Services
Disability Services, Chair
Mass Transit
Public Policy & Accountability
Vehicles & Safety
She was also a leader of the General Assembly and served as:
Chair, Local Government Caucus
Board of Directors/Secretary, Education Caucus
Her legislative priorities included education, healthcare, and transportation.

Ryg has a Masters in Public Administration and a Masters of Arts in Education from Roosevelt University and a Bachelor of Science in Family Services from Northern Illinois University. She is also a graduate of the Bowhay Institute for Legislative Leadership Development program.

Ryg resigned to rejoin the private sector on August 31, 2009.  She was replaced by Carol Sente.

References

External links
Illinois General Assembly - Representative Kathleen A. Ryg (D) 59th District official IL House website
Kathy Ryg official constituent website
Bills Committees
Project Vote Smart - Representative Kathleen A. Ryg (IL) profile
Follow the Money - Kathleen A Ryg
2008 2006 2004 2002 campaign contributions
Illinois House Democrats - Kathleen A. Ryg profile

Living people
Democratic Party members of the Illinois House of Representatives
Women state legislators in Illinois
1952 births
Roosevelt University alumni
Northern Illinois University alumni
People from Vernon Hills, Illinois
21st-century American politicians
21st-century American women politicians